St Peter's Roman Catholic Church is a Roman Catholic church in the town of Bloxwich, West Midlands, England. It is an active catholic church in the centre of the town and is notable for its two twin towers. The church plays an active role in both the Roman Catholic community and wider community as a hub for worship, events and other functions.

References

Catholic church buildings in the United Kingdom
Churches in Birmingham, West Midlands
Buildings and structures completed in 1869